The following events occurred in July 1911:

July 1, 1911 (Saturday)
The Agadir Crisis began at noon in Paris, when Germany's Ambassador to France, the Baron von Schoen, made a surprise visit to the French Foreign Ministry and delivered to Foreign Minister Justin de Selves a diplomatic note, announcing that Germany had sent a warship, the gunboat SMS Panther and troops, to occupy  Agadir, at that time a part of the protectorate of French Morocco.  The pretext was to protect German businesses and citizens in the small port, and the note ended "As soon as order and tranquility have returned to Morocco, the vessel entrusted with this protective mission will leave the port of Agadir."  The German infringement on French territory threatened to start a new European war.
Compulsory military service was inaugurated in Australia.
Eduard Sachau, linguist and archaeologist, completed his transcription and translation of  ancient Aramaic papyri.
Russia's Jewish Literary Society was ordered closed by Tsarist authorities in the capital city of  Saint Petersburg.
Born: Sergei Sokolov, Marshal of the Soviet Union, and Minister of Defense of USSR (1984–87); in Yevpatoria, Russian Empire (now Ukraine) (d. 2012)

July 2, 1911 (Sunday)
The comic strip Krazy Kat, by African-American cartoonist George Herriman and was spun off from The Dingbat Family (which it replaced), debuts. The strip ran until Herriman's death in 1944.
The United States completed its break of diplomatic relations with Colombia, closing the consulate general there.
The Interstate Commerce Commission ordered an investigation of all express train companies in the United States.
Claims totaling $250,000 were filed against Mexico for the deaths and injuries of Americans in El Paso during fighting at Juarez.
Born: 
Dorothy Horstmann, American physician who made the critical discovery that polio reaches the nervous system through the bloodstream; in Spokane (d. 2001)
Diego Fabbri, Italian playwright; in Forlì
Died: Felix Mottl, 54, director of the Royal Opera in Munich

July 3, 1911 (Monday)
The British strike of seamen ended, with the strikers winning most of their demands.
Two days after it was dispatched to French Morocco by Germany, the gunboat SMS Panther anchored off of the coast of Agadir.
The United States Senate voted 55-28 in favor of a resolution holding that the election of Senator William Lorimer of Illinois had been invalid, effectively removing him from office.
Turk Yurdu Cemiyet, the Association of the Turkish Homeland, was founded by Turkish supremacist Yusuf Akçura, Mehmed Emin and Ahmen Agaoglu.

July 4, 1911 (Tuesday)
Third baseman Rafael Almeida and outfielder Armando Marsans, both natives of Cuba, became the first Hispanic players in Major League Baseball history, debuting in Chicago for the Cincinnati Reds against the Cubs.  Although the two were dark-skinned and had played for a Negro team, they avoided the ban against African-American players by producing proof that they "were of Castilian rather than Negro heritage".
The hottest day of the 1911 United States heat wave set records that stood a century later, in Vermont (105° at Vernon) and New Hampshire (106° at Nashua), as well as 104° in Boston, and 113° in Junction City, Kansas.  In Chicago, 64 died in one day, and 51 the day before.
Born: 
Mitch Miller, American singer and television personality (Sing Along with Mitch); in Rochester, New York (d. 2010)
Frederick Seitz, American physicist, and co-proponent of Wigner–Seitz cell; in San Francisco (d. 2008)
 Elizabeth Peratrovich, civil rights activist for Alaskan native peoples; in Petersburg, Alaska (d. 1958)
Died: 
Vaughan Kester, 41, American novelist
Franklin Fyles, 64, American playwright and theater critic.

July 5, 1911 (Wednesday)
By a 253-46 vote, Britain's House of Lords passed a watered down version of the Parliament Act 1911 received from the House of Commons, including amendments made by Lord Lansdowne.
The record-breaking heat wave in North America ended after five days of record high temperatures.  In the first five days of July, more than 500 deaths were attributed to the heat.
Turkey began military preparations to suppress a revolt in Montenegro.
Born: Georges Pompidou, President of France from 1969 to 1974, Prime Minister 1962-68; in Montboudif, Cantal département (d. 1974)
Died: Maria Pia of Savoy, 63, Queen Consort of Portugal 1862-1889 as the wife of King Luis I, and later Queen Dowager of Portugal until the monarchy was abolished in 1910

July 6, 1911 (Thursday)
Charles Flint acquired nearly all of the Computing-Tabulating-Recording Company (which later became IBM), buying out Herman Hollerith for $1,210,500. For the next 10 years, Hollerith retained control of design changes in the CTR tabulating machines and stifled the growth of the company.
Publisher Charles Curtis debuted a new version of the farmers' magazine Country Gentleman, whose circulation had declined to only 2,000 paying subscribers at the time of acquisition. Within 30 years, he had increased the number of subscribers to 2,000,000. The magazine was discontinued in 1955 after being sold to the Farm Journal.
The arbitration treaty between the United States and the United Kingdom was signed.
Born: LaVerne Andrews, American singer and the eldest of the 1940s trio The Andrews Sisters; in Minneapolis (d. 1967)

July 7, 1911 (Friday)
In Washington, DC, the United States, Russia, the United Kingdom and Japan signed the Convention on the International Protection of Fur Seals, prohibiting hunting of the endangered fur seals in the North Pacific Ocean.  In the first six years, the seal population increased by 30 percent.
King George V and Queen Mary arrived in Dublin for a visit as sovereigns of Ireland.  They stayed until July 12.
Born: Gian-Carlo Menotti, Italian-born American composer (Amahl and the Night Visitors); in Cadegliano-Viconago (d. 2007)
Died: 
Edward Dicey, 79, English journalist and novelist
Alexander C. Mitchell, 50, U.S. Congressman who represented Kansas for only four months before his death.

July 8, 1911 (Saturday)
The city of Burbank, California, with 500 residents, was incorporated.  One century later, its population was over 100,000.
U.S. Vice President James S. Sherman, in his capacity as President of the U.S. Senate, broke a long-standing tradition in Congress of using only hand fans for cooling, by bringing the first electric fan to the Senate Chamber.  The same day, other members of Congress followed suit.
Died: Ira Erastus Davenport, 72, American spiritualist and magician

July 9, 1911 (Sunday)
Francisco I. Madero, who had won election as the President of Mexico in 1909 as the candidate of the Partido Nacional Antirreeleccionista (the National Anti-Reelection Party) on a platform of preventing presidents from serving consecutive terms, issued a manifesto rebranding the party after having accomplished the mission of amending the Mexican Constitution to allow presidents to serve a single six-year term.  Madero's organization was renamed the Progressive Constitutionalist Party (Partido Constitucional Progresista).
The leaders of France and Germany agreed to negotiate an end to the Agadir Crisis that had arisen over the two nations' African colonies.  Ultimately, Germany would recognize France's protectorate status over Morocco in return for the transfer of portions of the French Congo to Germany's neighboring colony, Kamerun.
Born: 
John Archibald Wheeler, American theoretical physicist who coined the astronomical terms "black hole" and "wormhole"; in Jacksonville, Florida (d. 2008)
Mervyn Peake, British writer and illustrator, best known for the Gormenghast series of books; in Lushan, Jiangxi Province, China  (d. 1968)
Aleksandrs Laime, Latvian-born explorer, most noted for being the first recorded human to reach Venezuela's Angel Falls; in Riga (d. 1994)

July 10, 1911 (Monday)
In arbitration by King George V, Chile was ordered to pay $935,000 to the United States Alsop firm.  Alsop had demanded $3,000,000 with interest; the $935K was paid on November 13.
The Royal Australian Navy was bestowed its name by King George V, having previously been the "Commonwealth Naval Forces."
Troops from Peru, arriving on the launch Loreto and backed up by the gunboat America, arrived at the settlement of La Pedrera, established by Colombia on disputed territory on the Apaporis, a tributary of the Amazon River.  Peruvian Lt.Col. Oscar Benavides gave the Colombians an ultimatum to abandon the outpost.  After a battle of two days, the Colombians surrendered, and agreements on July 15 and July 19 ended the fighting.

July 11, 1911 (Tuesday)
The Federal Express, a passenger train on the New York, New Haven & Hartford Railroad running the Boston to Washington route, jumped the track at Bridgeport at 3:35 am, killing 14 people and injured 42 more.
France's Chamber of Deputies voted 476-77 to postpone further discussion of the Moroccan problem.
The mining settlement of South Porcupine, Ontario was destroyed by forest fires that swept across the province.  Forest fires had broken out across Northern Ontario, and over four days, they would kill 400 or more people.

July 12, 1911 (Wednesday)
Ty Cobb of the Detroit Tigers, whose career record of stealing home 54 times is unbroken, stole second base, third base and home on three consecutive pitches by Harry Krause in the first inning of a 9-0 win over the Philadelphia Athletics.
Au Sable, Michigan, was destroyed by forest fires.

July 13, 1911 (Thursday)
Seventeen years old, Crown Prince Edward of the United Kingdom (the future King Edward VIII), was invested as the Prince of Wales.  For the first time since 1616, the ceremony took place in Wales itself, at Canarvon Castle, as a result of the efforts of Chancellor of the Exchequer David Lloyd George, a Welshman.
The Third Anglo-Japanese Agreement of Alliance was signed by the United Kingdom and Japan, extending the date of expiry from 1915 to 1921.

July 14, 1911 (Friday)
Rain began falling at Baguio in the Philippines and, between noon until noon the next day, broke the record for most rainfall in 24 hours (45.99 inches or 1168 mm).  By the time rain ended three days later, the total amount had been 88.85 inches (2239 mm).
Bobby Leach, a daring Welshman from Cornwall, became the second person (after Annie Edson Taylor), and the first man, to ride over Niagara Falls in a barrel and survive.  Ironically, Leach, who survived a 17-story plunge over a waterfall, would later suffer a fatal injury from slipping on an orange peel.

July 26, 1911 (Wednesday)
Golden Gate Park of San Francisco was selected as the site for the Panama-Pacific Exposition of 1915.
President Taft signed the American-Canadian reciprocity bill at 3:09 pm, although the Canadian Parliament had dissolved without voting on the measure.
The cruiser USS Des Moines arrived at Port-au-Prince to protect American citizens and businesses from an ongoing revolt in Haiti.
The ill-fated Canadian Pacific liner Empress of China was wrecked off the coast of Japan and put out of passenger service permanently.
Dusé Mohamed Ali convened the first Universal Races Congress, held in London.
At a fair in Plainfield, Illinois, "Professor" Harry Darnell, a balloonist whose act featured a performance on a trapeze, lost his footing and fell 700 feet to his death.

July 27, 1911 (Thursday)
Disturbed by the French Army's reluctance to retire aging or infirm generals, French Minister of Defense Adolphe Messimy ordered that any officer who was "unable to ride a horse" was to retire.  The order was soon rescinded as impractical, and most of the officers remained in positions of command until being removed in August and September 1914 after the outbreak of World War One.
Omar N. Bradley, 18, of Moberly, Missouri, was notified that he had been accepted to the U.S. Military Academy and that he had five days to report to West Point, New York.  He would become among the 164 graduates of the Class of 1915, of whom 59 went on to become generals, including Bradley and Dwight D. Eisenhower, both of whom reached the five-star rank.
Born: Rayner Heppenstall, British novelist and radio producer; in Lockwood, West Yorkshire (d. 1981)

July 28, 1911 (Friday)
General Joseph Joffre was installed as the first Chief of the General Staff of the Army of France, a position that had been created to remedy the lack of a peacetime commander-in-chief of the Army.
Paul Geidel, a 17-year old bellboy at the Iroquois Hotel in New York City, was arrested after killing an elderly stockbroker, William Henry Jackson, who was a guest.  Geidel would remain in prison for more than 68 years, finally being released at the age of 86 from the Fishkill Correctional Facility in Beacon, New York on May 7, 1980.  His incarceration remains the longest-ever time served by an American inmate. 
At the age of seven months, future French novelist Jean Genet was left by his mother at the Bureau d'Abandon de l'Hospice des Enfants-Assistes in Paris, to become a ward of the state, and was placed with a foster family the next day.
Haitian troops defeated rebels in a battle at Les Cayes.
Canadian Prime Minister Wilfrid Laurier announced a plan of cooperation between Canada and the navies of Great Britain, Australia and New Zealand.
The Australasian Antarctic Expedition began as the SY Aurora departed London.

July 29, 1911 (Saturday)
Parliament was dissolved in Canada after continued obstruction to the reciprocity bill with the United States, with an election set for September 21.  The Conservative Party, led by R.L. Borden and opposing reciprocity, would win a majority in the next election.
A bounty of $100,000 (33,000 pounds) for the capture or killing of the ex-Shah was set by the Persian government.
Born: Ján Cikker, Slovak classical composer; in  Besztercebánya, Austro-Hungarian Empire (now Banská Bystrica, Slovakia) (d. 1989)

July 30, 1911 (Sunday)
Author Henry James, who had been born in New York City, left the United States for the last time.  James, who had alternated between Europe and North America as his residence, would become a British citizen prior to his death in 1916.

July 31, 1911 (Monday)
General Motors went public, becoming the first automobile company to list its stock for sale on the New York Stock Exchange.
Russia's ambassador to Persia demanded the resignation of Treasurer General W. Morgan Shuster, an American businessman who had been hired by the Iranian parliament to manage the nation's finances.  Germany's minister made a similar demand the next day.
Standard Oil announced its plans for breaking up the monopoly by November.

References

1911
1911-07
1911-07